Kusum Lata Ailawadi is an American economist. She is currently the Charles Jordan 1911 TU'12 Professor of Marketing at Tuck School of Business, Dartmouth College.

Education
PhD, University of Virginia, 1991
MBA, Indian Institute of Management, 1984
BSc (Honors), St. Stephen's College, Delhi University, 1982

References

External links
 

Year of birth missing (living people)
Living people
Dartmouth College faculty
American women economists
University of Virginia alumni
21st-century American women